The Nitriliruptoria are a class of Actinomycetota, which contains five species distributed across orders.

Phylogeny
The species of Nitriliruptoria exhibit the following phylogenetic relationships:

References

Actinomycetota
Bacteria classes